Ivan Matteoni (born 21 August 1971) is a retired Sammarinese footballer who played as a midfielder.

International
Ivan made 44 caps with the San Marino national football team from 1990 to 2003. He played the last match of his international career against Sweden on 6 September 2003.

References

1971 births
Living people
Sammarinese footballers
San Marino international footballers
Association football midfielders
S.P. Tre Fiori players
A.C. Juvenes/Dogana players
A.S. San Giovanni players
S.P. Tre Penne players
Sammarinese expatriate footballers
Sammarinese expatriate sportspeople in Italy
Expatriate footballers in Italy